Volva may refer to: 
 Völva, one of various Old Norse terms for a North Germanic seeress
 Volva (gastropod), a genus of sea snails
 Volva (mycology), a cup-like structure at the base of a mushroom

See also 
 Vulva (disambiguation)
 Volvo, a manufacturing company, along with Volvo Cars, which separated from it.